Santoshi Mata or Santoshi Maa is a Hindu goddess, who is venerated as "the Mother of Satisfaction", the meaning of her name. Santoshi Mata is particularly worshipped by women of North India and Nepal. A vrata (ritual fast) called the Santoshi Maa vrata performed by women on 16 consecutive Fridays wins the goddess' favour.

Santoshi Mata emerged as a goddess in the early 1960s. Her prayer initially spread through word of mouth, vrata-pamphlet literature, and poster art. Her vrata was gaining popularity with North Indian women. However, it was the 1975 Bollywood film Jai Santoshi Maa ("Victory to Santoshi Maa")—narrating the story of the goddess and her ardent devotee Satyavati—which propelled this then little-known "new" goddess to the heights of devotional fervour. With the rising popularity of the film, Santoshi Mata entered the pan-Indian Hindu pantheon and her images and shrines were incorporated in Hindu temples. The film portrayed the goddess to be the daughter of the popular Hindu god Ganesha and related her to the Raksha Bandhan festival, however, it had no basis in Hindu scriptures.

Historical development
The 1975 film Jai Santoshi Maa elevated Santoshi Mata, a little-known "new" goddess to the pan-Indian Hindu pantheon. The screenings of the film were accompanied by religious rituals by the audience. Some of the audience entered the theatre barefoot, as in a Hindu temple, and small shrines and temples dedicated to the goddess, started springing up all over North India. The film attained cult status and years after its release, special matinee Friday screenings were organized for women, who observed the goddess' Friday vrata (ritual fast) and engaged in her worship. The success of this low-budget film and media reports of the "sudden emergence of a modern celluloid goddess" resulted in scholarly interest in Santoshi Mata.

Art historian Michael Brand suggested Santoshi Mata emerged in the early 1960s with the establishment of five widely spread temples in North India. Her iconography also was crystallized in this period and slowly spread through poster art. Her cult spread among women through word of
mouth, pamphlet literature, and poster art. According to Brand and Professor John Stratton Hawley of the Barnard College (Department of Religion), it was the wife of Vijay Sharma, the director of Jai Santoshi Maa, who urged her husband to "spread the goddess's message".

Hawley notes: "As her film brought her to life, Santoshi Ma quickly became one of the most important and widely worshiped goddesses in India, taking her place in poster-art form in the altar rooms of millions of Hindu homes. [...] Yet it is hard to conceive that Santoshi Ma could have granted such instant satisfaction to so many people had she not been part of a larger and already well-integrated culture of the Goddess. Her new devotees could immediately recognize many of her characteristic moods and attributes, and feel them deeply, because she shared them with other goddesses long since familiar to them." Hawley stresses that Santoshi Mata's iconography took elements from the familiar form of the Hindu goddesses. Santoshi Mata's characteristic posture standing or sitting on a lotus mirrored that of the goddess Lakshmi (Shri). The weapons she held—the sword and the trident—are traditional attributes of the goddess Durga. According to sociologist Veena Das, the story of Santoshi Mata and Satyavati from Jai Santoshi Maa borrows from older Hindu legends like those of sati Anusuya, who humbled the pride of the jealous goddess triad and of an ardent devotee—of the goddess Manasa—who has to face opposition from her family and other goddesses to worship her patron Manasa.

Brand, Das, Professor Kathleen Erndl of the Florida State University (Department of Religion) and Stanley Kurtz who authored the book "All the Mothers are One" considered that there was nothing "new" about Santoshi Mata, rather she was just another model of the prototype Hindu Divine Mother. Erndl identified Santoshi Mata with the lion-riding goddess, Sheranvali.

Hawley notes that although a temple dedicated to Santoshi Mata existed in Jodhpur before the release of the Jai Santoshi Maa, before 1967, the same temple was dedicated to a goddess called Lal Sagar ki Mata—The Mother of the Lal Sagar Lake, on whose banks the temple is situated. However, Lal Sagar ki Mata unlike the vegetarian Santoshi Mata, was offered animal sacrifices. With rising popularity of the film, Santoshi Mata images and shrine were incorporated in Hindu temples and in some cases, Santoshi Mata was installed as the presiding deity like in Jodhpur, deposing other goddesses from that status.

According to Professor Philip Lutgendorf of the University of Iowa (Modern Indian Studies), the Santoshi Maa vrata was gaining popularity among women in North India in the 1960s, a decade before the release of Jai Santoshi Maa. He further notes that the fact that Santoshi Mata expected the inexpensive raw sugar and roasted chickpeas—associated with the "non-elite"—as offerings in her vrata and her benevolent nature made her popular with the masses. However, Das considers the film was instrumental in spreading the Santoshi Mata worship to the illiterate, who until then could not have known the written vrata katha (legend related to the vrata).

Even though the script of Jai Santoshi Maa has no scriptural basis, scholars Anita Raina Thapan and Lawrence Cohen cite Santoshi Mata's cult as evidence of Ganesha's continuing evolution as a popular deity.

Vrata
The Santoshi Mata vrata or devotional fast is to be observed on 16 successive Fridays or until one's wish is fulfilled. The devotee should perform a puja (worship) of Santoshi Mata and offer her flowers, incense and a bowl of raw sugar and roasted chickpeas (gur-chana). The devotee wakes up at early morning, remembering the Goddess. Only one meal is taken during the fast day, and devotees avoid eating bitter or sour food and serving these to others, as sour or bitter food is somewhat addictive and hinders satisfaction. When the wish is granted, a devotee must then organise a udyapan ("bringing to conclusion") ceremony, where eight boys are to be served a festive meal.

In this type of worship, the devotee has to follow other strictures such as avoiding quarrels and hurting anyone. By means of this vrata one can live with harmony because the bad habits in human life like to ignore faith and to say false, to behave arrogantly can be removed. This vrata teaches the devotee to spread love, sympathy and happiness.

Temples

There are many temples throughout India and abroad where the principal deity is Mata Santoshi.

North India: Harinagar, Delhi (NCR)

South India: Jai Nagar, Trichy (Tamil Nadu)

East India: Chakradharpur (Jharkhand)

West India: Lall Sagar, Jodhpur (Rajasthan) - Shri Santoshi Mata Mandir Jodhpur Rajasthan India (first temple). There is also a famous temple in Dombivli (west) near Mumbai.

Center India: Shri Santoshi Mata Mandir Guna M.P India (Second Temple) Shri Santoshi Mata Mandir Guna M.P India (second temple)

Legends

Vrata-katha
Unlike other Indian mythological films which were based on the Hindu epics or the Puranic scriptures, Jai Santoshi Maa was based on a popular pamphlet about the vrata katha (legend of the ritual fast) of Santoshi Mata's Friday vrata. The vrata katha is as follows: An old woman had seven sons, the youngest of whom was irresponsible so she served him the leftovers of his brother's meals as his daily meal. The wife of the youngest son learned of this and told her husband, who left the house to seek his fortune. He acquired work with a merchant and became wealthy, but forgot about his wife. His wife was tormented by her in-laws in absence of her husband. Once, she learned of the sixteen-week Santoshi Ma vrata and performed it. As a result, Santoshi Mata appeared in her husband's dream and informed him of his wife's plight. He returned home wealthy and set up a separate household with his wife. In the udyapan ceremony of the vrata, the in-laws plotted against the wife and served sour food to the eight boys, offending Santoshi Mata. As a consequence, her husband was arrested. The wife re-performed the vrata and the udyapan. Her husband was released from prison and she soon bore a son. Once, the goddess visited the family, in a terrifying form; while the in-laws fled, the wife recognized the goddess and worshipped her. Then the in-laws asked forgiveness of the goddess and the whole family was blessed by the goddess. A. K. Ramanujan calls this tale with nameless characters as "the most interior kind of folktales: those generally told by women within domestic space." The vrata katha also does not associate the goddess with Ganesha—the god of obstacle removal and beginnings, who is described as her father in the film and other devotee literature.

Film - Jai Santoshi Maa 1975 

The film Jai Santoshi Maa links the birth of Santoshi Mata to the festival of Raksha Bandhan, where a sister ties a rakhi string bracelet on her brother's wrist and the brother gifts his sister sweets, gifts and a promise of protection. When Ganesha's sister Manasa celebrates the festival with him, his sons ask Ganesha to grant them a sister. Although Ganesha initially refuses, upon the repeated pleas of his two wives Riddhi and Siddhi, sons, sister and the divine sage Narada, Ganesha creates Santoshi Mata through two flames rising from his wives' breasts. Narada decreed that this mind-born daughter of Ganesha will always fulfil everyone’s desires and thus, would be called Santoshi Maa, the Mother of Satisfaction.

The film then shifts from the heavenly abode of Ganesha to the earth, where the story of the goddess's devotee Satyavati is told. Satyavati, prays to the goddess, to get her married to Birju and after her wish is granted, she undertakes a pilgrimage of the temples of Santoshi Mata with her husband. The mischievous Narada incites the jealousy of the goddesses Brahmani, Lakshmi and Parvati (Ganesha's mother, thus Santoshi Mata's grandmother)—wives of the Hindu Trinity of gods Brahma, Vishnu and Shiva respectively—towards the "new" goddess Santoshi Mata. The goddess triad unleash their wrath on Satyavati. Like the vrata katha, Birju leaves to make a fortune. The goddess triad spread the rumour that Birju is dead and the lone "widow" Satyavati is tormented by her sisters-in-law. Birju forgets about Satyavati, but on the fulfilment of the Friday vrata by Satyavati, Santoshi Mata appears in Birju's dream and reminds him of his wife. Birju returns home a rich man and establishes a separate household with Satyavati. At the udayan ceremony, Satyavati's sisters-in-law mix sour food in the ritual meal, to be served to eight boys. Santoshi Mata punishes the sisters-in-law by crippling them and their sons who have the ritual meal, fall dead. Satyavati is blamed for this misfortune. But, finally when Satyavati prays to the goddess, the goddess appears before Satyavati and restores the boys and their mothers. Satyvati's kin then ask for the goddess' forgiveness. Ultimately, the goddess triad also repent and say that they were just testing Satyavati's devotion. Narada finally asks the goddess triad, their husbands and Ganesha to bless Santoshi Mata, which Lutgendorf interprets as an explicit confirmation to the new goddess's incorporation in the Hindu pantheon.

References
 Notes

 Books

External links

 Vrat Vidhi, Vrat Katha, Aartis, Bhajans, Chalisa, 108 Names, Movies, Photos & Temples of Santoshi Maa
 Santoshi Maa Aarti जय सन्तोषी माता
 Santoshi Maa Aarti मैं तो आरती उतारूँ रे

Hindu goddesses
Hindu folk deities
Harvest goddesses